De Heuvel is a hamlet in the Dutch province of Gelderland. It is a part of the municipality of Buren, and lies about 11 km northwest of Tiel.

It was first mentioned in 1844 as De Heuvel, and means hill. It is not a statical entity, and the postal authorities have placed it under Beusichem. It consists of about 10 houses.

References
 

Populated places in Gelderland
Buren